Pavlopoulos (Greek: Παυλόπουλος) is a Greek surname, which means son of Paul. The female version of the name is Pavlopoulou (Greek: Παυλοπούλου). Notable examples include:

George Pavlopoulos (1924-2008), Greek poet
Nikolaos Pavlopoulos (1909-1990), Greek sculptor and writer
Prokopis Pavlopoulos (born 1950), Greek lawyer, professor and politician

Greek-language surnames